The Bicycle Racer is a 1983 Colombian drama film directed by Lisandro Duque Naranjo. It was entered into the 13th Moscow International Film Festival.

Cast
 Gina Morett as Emma
 Eduardo Gazcón as Álvaro
 Argemiro Castiblanco as Humberto
 Carlos Parada as Never
 Marcelo Gaete as Murillo
 Omar Sánchez as Rogelio
 Fernando Ramírez as Policía
 José Patrocinio Jiménez as himself

References

External links
 

1983 films
1983 drama films
1980s Spanish-language films
Colombian drama films